Davey Peak is a small rock peak  high,  west of Scudder Peak on the south side of Toney Mountain, Marie Byrd Land. It was mapped by the United States Geological Survey from ground surveys and from U.S. Navy air photos, 1959–66, and named by the Advisory Committee on Antarctic Names for Gary R. Davey, a meteorologist at Byrd Station in 1966.

References 

Mountains of Marie Byrd Land